White Fang is a 1993 television series loosely based on the 1906 novel by Jack London. During its single season (1993–94) 25 episodes were produced. It tells the story of young Matt Scott who adopts a dog named Fang who continually saves him from bad situations.

Cast and characters

Main 
 Jaimz Woolvett as Matt Scott
 David McIlwraith as Judge Adam Scott
 Denise Virieux as Kate Scott
 Ken Blackburn as Hank Blair
 Lee Grant as Vera Dillon
 Kevin Atkinson as Chief David
 Fang as himself

Recurring 
 Gianluca Venantini as Steve (4, 10, 17)
 Veronika Logan as Maggie (4, 11, 17, 19)
 Carin C. Tietze as Joanna (8, 14, 18)
 Helmut Berger as Sam Calman (9, 13, 16)

Guest 
 Stig Eldred as Beauty Smith (1, 11)
 Chic Littlewood as Dog's owner
 John Cairney
 Karl Urban as David
 John Bach as Tom Cooper (6)
 David Aston as Jake (7)
 Ian Watkin as Uncle Ray (21)

Episodes

Home releases
Echo Bridge Home Entertainment  Alliance Home Entertainment has released the entire series on DVD in Region 1 (US and Canada) on the defunct Platinum Disc Corp. label.  It was initially released in three volume sets in 2002.  On December 7, 2004, they re-packaged all 3 volumes in one 3-disc set entitled White Fang.  In July 2008 they were bundled together again to create "White Fang: The Complete Series", a tin box-set.

References

External links

1990s Canadian drama television series
1990s New Zealand television series
1993 Canadian television series debuts
1994 Canadian television series endings
English-language television shows
New Zealand drama television series
Television series by South Pacific Pictures
Television shows about dogs
Television shows based on works by Jack London
Television shows set in New Zealand
White Fang